Pita Taumoepenu (born March 9, 1994) is an American football outside linebacker for the Vegas Vipers of the XFL. He played college football at Utah. He was drafted by the San Francisco 49ers in the sixth round of the 2017 NFL Draft.

Professional career
Coming out of Utah, Taumoepenu was ranked as the 28th best outside linebacker prospect by CBS Sports. On October 4, 2016, it was announced Taumoepenu had received an invitation to play in the NFLPA Collegiate Bowl. On January 21, 2017, Taumoepenu attended the NFLPA Collegiate Bowl and recorded four solo tackles and one sack as a part of Jim Zorn's American team who lost 27–7 to Mike Martz's National. He was one of eight Utah players invited to the NFL Scouting Combine in Indianapolis, Indiana. He completed the majority of combine drills and finished second amongst all the defensive lineman in the 40-yard dash and the three-cone drill, only behind Kansas State's Jordan Willis, and finished sixth in the short shuttle. On March 23, 2017, Taumoepenu attended Utah's pro day and performed the majority of combine drills. He attended a private meeting with Pittsburgh Steelers. At the conclusion of the pre-draft process, Taumoepenu was projected to be a seventh round pick or priority undrafted free agent. He was ranked the 29th best outside linebacker prospect by NFLDraftScout.com.

San Francisco 49ers
The San Francisco 49ers selected Taumoepenu in the sixth round (202nd overall) of the 2017 NFL Draft. The 49ers previously acquired the pick used to select Taumoepenu in a trade with the Denver Broncos in a trade that sent Vernon Davis to the Denver Broncos. On May 4, 2017, the 49ers signed him to a four-year, $2.54 million contract that includes a signing bonus of $145,444.

Throughout training camp, he competed for a roster spot against Brock Coyle, Eli Harold, Ray-Ray Armstrong, Dekoda Watson, and Jimmie Gilbert. Head coach Kyle Shanahan named him the third strongside linebacker to begin the season, behind Eli Harold and Dekoda Watson. On September 1, 2018, Taumoepenu was waived by the 49ers and was signed to the practice squad the next day. On December 5, 2018, Taumoepenu was promoted to the active roster. On May 28, 2019, Taumoepenu was waived by the 49ers.

Arizona Cardinals
On May 29, 2019, Taumoepenu was claimed off waivers by the Arizona Cardinals. He was waived/injured during final roster cuts on August 31, 2019, and reverted to the team's injured reserve list the next day. He was waived from injured reserve with an injury settlement on September 10, 2019.

Seattle Seahawks
On November 20, 2019, Taumoepenu was signed to the Seattle Seahawks practice squad. He signed a reserve/future contract with the Seahawks on January 14, 2020. He was waived on May 4, 2020, but rejoined the team on August 30, 2020. He was waived again four days later.

Atlanta Falcons
On October 20, 2020, Taumoepenu was signed to the Atlanta Falcons practice squad. He was elevated to the active roster on November 7 for the team's week 9 game against the Denver Broncos, and reverted to the practice squad after the game. His practice squad contract with the team expired after the season on January 11, 2021.

Denver Broncos
On May 17, 2021, Taumoepenu signed with the Denver Broncos. He was released on August 23, 2021. He re-signed with their practice squad on September 22, 2021. He was released on January 5, 2022.

Vegas Vipers
Taumoepenu was drafted by the Vegas Vipers in the 2023 XFL Draft.

NFL statistics

References

External links
 Utah Utes football bio

1994 births
Living people
American football defensive ends
American people of Tongan descent
Arizona Cardinals players
Atlanta Falcons players
Denver Broncos players
Vegas Vipers players
Players of American football from Utah
San Francisco 49ers players
Seattle Seahawks players
Sportspeople from Provo, Utah
Tongan players of American football
Utah Utes football players